Kremastochloris is a genus of green algae, in the family Hypnomonadaceae. Its sole species is Kremastochloris conus.

References

External links

Chlamydomonadales genera
Chlamydomonadales
Monotypic algae genera